NGC 5820 is a lenticular galaxy in the constellation Boötes. It lies near NGC 5821, a galaxy with a similar mass at the same redshift.

References

External links

Distance
Image NGC 5820
SIMBAD data

Interacting galaxies
NGC 05820
5820
09642
139
53511
53511
+09-25-001
Lenticular galaxies